Botoșani Region (Regiunea Botoșani) was one of the newly established (in 1950) administrative divisions of the People's Republic of Romania, copied after the Soviet-style of territorial organisation. It existed until 1952 when it was merged into Suceava Region.

History
The region was established through Law nr. 5 on September 6, 1950. 
The capital of the region was Botoșani, and its territory comprised the area of the nowadays Botoșani County. On September 19, 1952 the region was dissolved though Decree nr. 331 and its raions were incorporated into the Suceava Region.

Neighbors

Botoșani Region had as neighbors:

East: Moldavian Soviet Socialist Republic; South: Iași Region; West: Suceava Region; North: Ukrainian Soviet Socialist Republic.

Raions

Botoșani Region consisted of the following raions: Botoșani, Darabani, Săveni, Dorohoi, Trușești.

Regions of the People's Republic of Romania